Military aircraft insignia are insignia applied to military aircraft to identify the nation or branch of military service to which the aircraft belong. Many insignia are in the form of a circular roundel or modified roundel; other shapes such as stars, crosses, squares, or triangles are also used. Insignia are often displayed on the sides of the fuselage, the upper and lower surfaces of the wings, as well as on the fin or rudder of an aircraft, although considerable variation can be found amongst different air arms and within specific air arms over time.

History

France
The first use of national insignia on military aircraft was before the First World War by the French Aéronautique Militaire, which mandated the application of roundels in 1912. The chosen design was the French national cockade, which consisted of a blue-white-red emblem, going outwards from center to rim, mirroring the colours of the French flag. In addition, aircraft rudders were painted the same colours in vertical stripes, with the blue vertical stripe of the tricolors forwardmost. Similar national cockades were designed and adopted for use as aircraft roundels by the air forces of other countries, including the U.S. Army Air Service.

Germany
Of all the early operators of military aircraft, Germany was unusual in not using "round" roundels. After evaluating several possible markings, including a black, red and white checkerboard, a similarly coloured roundel, and black stripes, it chose a black "iron" cross on a square white field, as it was already in use on various flags and reflected Germany's heritage as the Holy Roman Empire. The Imperial German Army's mobilization led to orders in September 1914 to paint all-black Eisernes Kreuz (iron cross) insignia with wide-flared arms over a white field — usually square in shape — on the wings and tails of all aircraft flown by its air arm, then known as the Fliegertruppe des Deutschen Kaiserreiches. The fuselage was also usually marked with a cross on each side, but this was optional. The form and location of the initial cross was largely up to the painter, which led to considerable variation, and even to the white portion being omitted. An iron cross with explicit proportions superseded the first cross in July 1916. Initially, this second cross was also painted on a white field, but in October it was reduced to a 5 cm border completely surrounding the cross, even the ends of the flared arms. That same month, the Army's air arm was renamed Deutsche Luftstreitkräfte. In March 1918, a straight black cross with narrow white borders on all sides of the cross was ordered, but proportions were not set until April, resulting in many of those repainted in the field having non-standard proportions. This was then replaced in May by a narrower, straight-armed cross that extended the full chord of wings, with the white border restricted to the sides of the cross's bars. In June, it ceased to be used full chord, with the bars all being the same length. The white on any of these could be omitted when used on a white background, and sometimes on the rudder or on night bombers.

Much like the French roundel, variations of the cross would be used on countries allied with Germany, including the Austro-Hungary (combined with red-white-red stripes on the wings until 1916), Bulgaria, Croatia (stylized as a leaf), Hungary (reversed colors), Romania (a blue-rimmed yellow cross with the tricolor roundel in the middle; the shape was also the stylized monogram of the monarch), and Slovakia (blue cross with a red dot in the middle).

With the dissolution of the German Army's Luftstreitkräfte in May 1920, military insignia would disappear until the rise of the Nazi Party, which imposed new rules on aircraft in 1937, starting with the use of the German red/white/black flag on the tails' starboard side of all aircraft, with the port side showing a Nazi Party flag. When the Luftwaffe's re-establishment was made official, these markings were used by military aircraft, while the 1918 Balkenkreuz crosses were reintroduced. Two standardized proportions of the crosses were introduced by July 1939, with differing widths for the quartet of white "flanks" on each insignia. When camouflage was introduced prior to the invasion of Poland, the flags were dispensed with, replacing them with a black and white swastika on both sides of the tail. During the ensuing war, the crosses would be further simplified, leaving only the borders in a contrasting colour.

After the Second World War, West Germany reverted to using a variation of the 1916 iron cross, using the white "flanks" of the Balkenkreuz following the now-curved sides of each arm, while East Germany used a diamond marking based on their flag, with the coat of arms from the flag. The reunification of Germany in 1990 resulted in the West German iron cross replacing the East German insignia for German military aircraft.

United Kingdom and British Commonwealth nations

The British Royal Flying Corps (RFC) abandoned their original painted Union Flags because, from a distance, they looked too much like the Eisernes Kreuz (Iron Cross) used on German aircraft. The Royal Naval Air Service used either a plain red ring (with the clear-doped linen covering forming the light coloured centre), or a red-rimmed white circle on their wings for a short period — almost exactly resembling those in simultaneous use by the neutral predecessors of today's Royal Danish Air Force — before both British air arms adopted a roundel resembling the French one, but with the colours reversed, (red-white-blue from centre to rim). The two separate air arms joined to form the Royal Air Force on April 1, 1918.
The British roundel design, with variations in proportions and shades, has existed in one form or another to this very day. The RCAF roundel was based on the RAF roundel used previously on Canadian military aircraft. From World War I onwards, a variant of the British red-white-blue roundel with the white omitted has been used on camouflaged aircraft, which between the wars meant night bombers. During the Second World War, the colours were toned down and the proportions adjusted to reduce the brightness of the roundel, with the white being reduced to a thin line, or eliminated. In the Asia-Pacific region, the red inner circle of roundels was painted white or light blue to avoid confusion with Hinomaru markings on Japanese aircraft (still used by the Japan Self-Defense Forces to this day), much as the United States roundel omitted the red for the same reason.

After the Second World War, the RAF roundel design was modified by Commonwealth air forces, with the central red disc replaced with a red maple leaf (Royal Canadian Air Force), red kangaroo (Royal Australian Air Force), red kiwi (Royal New Zealand Air Force), and an orange Springbok (South African Air Force); the South African version of the RAF roundel existed until 1958.

United States

Low-visibility insignia

In the later stages of the World War I, the British Royal Flying Corps started using roundels without conspicuous white circles on night-flying aircraft, such as the Handley Page O/400. As early as 1942-43, and again in recent decades, "low-visibility" insignia have increasingly been used on camouflaged aircraft. These have subdued, low-contrast colours (often shades of grey or black) and frequently take the form of stenciled outlines. Previously, low-visibility markings were used to increase ambiguity as to whose aircraft it was, and to avoid compromising the camouflage, all while still complying with international norms governing recognition markings.

The World War II German Luftwaffe often used such "low-visibility" versions of their national Balkenkreuz insignia from the mid-war period through to V-E Day, omitting the central black "core" cross and only using the "flanks" of the cross instead, in either black or white versions, which was often done (as an outline only) to the vertical fin or rudder's swastika as well.

Fin flashes

In addition to insignia displayed on military aircraft wings and fuselages, usually in the form of roundels, a fin flash may also be displayed on the fin or rudder. A fin flash often takes the form of vertical, horizontal or slanted stripes in the same colours as the main insignia, and may be referred to as "rudder stripes" if they appear on the rudder instead of the fin, as with the French Armée de l'Air. Alternatively, a national flag or a roundel may be used.

Current insignia of national air forces 
Images shown in the following sections are as they appear on the left side of the aircraft (i.e. with the left side of the fin flash leading). In cases where there are no asymmetrical details, such as coats of arms or text that cannot be reversed, the image may be reversed for the right side (such as with the Royal Air Force fin flash) to keep the same side forward, much as with a flag. When a national flag is used, the left side of the aircraft often displays the back side of the flag as it is normally flown. Exceptions include the German Third Reich's ostensibly "civilian" aircraft in the 1930s, which used the old black-white-red German flag on the right side of the fin and rudder and the Nazi Party flag on the left side.

For some countries, a low-visibility variant is also used to avoid compromising aircraft camouflage, and in some cases, to avoid producing a hot spot visible to infrared sensors, such as those used on air-to-air missiles.

Government insignia

Former insignia of national air forces

See also
Aircraft recognition
Cockade
List of air forces
Nose art

References

External links

Military Aircraft Insignia
Roundels of the World
History of the RAF roundel
Russian and Soviet aircraft simbols (sic)

Military insignia
Military aviation
Aircraft markings